Love Songs 4 the Streets 2 is the fourth studio album by American rapper Lil Durk. It was released on August 2, 2019, by Only the Family, Alamo Records and Interscope Records. It serves as a sequel to his commercial mixtape, Love Songs for the Streets (2017). The album features guest appearances from King Von, 21 Savage, A Boogie wit da Hoodie, Nicki Minaj, Meek Mill, and Key Glock. It peaked at number four on the Billboard 200 in the United States.

Critical reception

Love Songs 4 the Streets 2 was met with generally positive reviews. At Metacritic, the album received an average score of 73 out of 100, based on four reviews.

AllMusic's critic Fred Thomas gave the album a positive review, praising  Durk's flows change up between the mixtape's best material. Thomas further says that "The 16 songs use a wide variety of stylistic approaches while centering around Durk's lyrical narratives of desperation and survival. While not all of it feels essential, the high points are fantastic examples of the rapper at his best." Pitchforks critic Dean Van Nguyen had positive opinions regarding the album, saying that "Lil Durk's music offers a sobering depiction of life outside of rap myths. He writes like someone keeping his head above water, hustling paycheck to paycheck, with dwindling hopes that a career in music will provide all promised riches." He implied that Durk's songwriting and lyricism has improved, also stating that "culling these missteps would have helped the tape's batting average, but they can't mask Durk's undeniable strengths".

Commercial performance
Love Songs 4 the Streets 2 debuted at number four on the US Billboard 200, earning 44,000 album-equivalent units (with 4,000 copies in pure album sales) in its first week. This became Lil Durk's first US top-five album. The 16-track project also accumulated a total of 52.7 million on-demand audio streams that week.

Track listing

Charts

Weekly charts

Year-end charts

References

2019 mixtape albums
Sequel albums
Lil Durk albums
Albums produced by Boi-1da
Albums produced by Jahlil Beats